Jacob van Moppes (18 August 1876 – 26 March 1943) was a Dutch wrestler. He competed in the men's Greco-Roman lightweight at the 1908 Summer Olympics. He was killed in the Sobibor extermination camp during World War II.

References

External links
 

1876 births
1943 deaths
Dutch male sport wrestlers
Olympic wrestlers of the Netherlands
Wrestlers at the 1908 Summer Olympics
Sportspeople from Amsterdam
Dutch people who died in Sobibor extermination camp
Dutch Jews who died in the Holocaust
Dutch civilians killed in World War II